Deng Xiaogang (born September 1960) is a Chinese scientist who is vice president of PLA Academy of Military Science, a former president of National University of Defense Technology, and an academician of the Chinese Academy of Sciences. He is an alternate member of the 19th Central Committee of the Chinese Communist Party.

Biography 
Deng was born in Mianyang, Sichuan, in September 1960. He secondary studied at Nanshan High School. In 1981, he entered Chengdu Aeronautic Polytechnic, majoring in machining operation. In 1983, he was admitted to Northwestern Polytechnical University, graduating in 1989 with a bachelor's degree and his master's degree in aerodynamics. He went on to receive his doctor's degree in 1992 at China Aerodynamics Research and Development Center under the supervision of Zhang Hanxin. He was a postdoctoral fellow at Beihang University and then the University of Electro-Communications in Japan.

He was honored as a Distinguished Young Scholar by the National Science Fund for Distinguished Young Scholars in 2002. In July 2009, he became director of the newly founded State Key Laboratory of Aerodynamics. In July 2017, he was appointed president of National University of Defense Technology, succeeding Yang Xuejun.

Honours and awards 
 7 December 2015 Member of the Chinese Academy of Sciences

References 

1960 births
Living people
People from Mianyang
Scientists from Sichuan
Northwestern Polytechnical University alumni
Members of the Chinese Academy of Sciences
People's Liberation Army generals from Sichuan
People's Republic of China politicians from Sichuan
Chinese Communist Party politicians from Sichuan
Alternate members of the 19th Central Committee of the Chinese Communist Party
Presidents of the National University of Defense Technology